Albania's Golgotha: Indictment of the Exterminators of the Albanian People,  is a German published document of 1913 which was written by the Austrian publicist and politician  (1875-1953). The document is a compilation of news which he gathered when traveling in the Vilayet of Kosovo during the Serbian invasion of 1912-1913, explaining in detail the full-scale massacres, rape, expulsions, torture and abuse which Albanian civilians suffered under rule by the Serb army and Chetnik paramilitaries. According to the documents of Freundlich, 25,000 Albanians were massacred in total. The document describes the methods of ethnic cleansing which was used to remove the Albanian population of North Macedonia, Northern Albania, and Kosovo. The document was re-translated by Robert Elsie. The reports were confirmed by the International Commission to Inquire into the Causes and Conduct of the Balkan War.

Content
Freundlich writes of the "thousand of men, women, children and old people who were slain or tortured to death". The report contains information on how entire villages were marauded and burnt to the ground and the women and young girls being raped, and the countryside plundered, ravaged and swimming in blood". He called for an international investigation demanding that Serbian and Montenegrin forces leave Northern Albania and that the atrocities stop. Freundlich was also told by Serbian officials that they were going to wipe out the Albanians, despite protests from the Great Powers. The war crimes were, according to Freundlich, fully supported by the Serbian authorities. He also describes how the Serb regular army, together with Chetniks, attacked unarmed civilians, strangled children and elderly and raped 12-year-old girls. The report gained much attention in Europe with news-bureaus reporting of "appalling atrocities" being committed by the Serb armies. The Kreuzzeitung reported on the "extermination of the Albanian population" and The Daily Chronicle about the massacre of "2,000 Arnauts in Kumanovo" and another "5,000 in Pristina"

The Il Messaggero of Rome reported of "heinous massacres" of the Albanians in the Vilayet of Kosovo. The French "L'Humanité" reported of plundering, massacres and destruction. Freundlich called for the Great Powers help in order to protect the "defenseless population against an army with a state" referring to how the Albanians did not resist the invading Serb forces but were, despite their cooperation, massacred. He mentions how Serb soldiers, in the village of Kumanovo, set fire to houses, and smoked the inhabitants out and then shooting them. The reports include descriptions of how Catholic Albanians and priests were murdered by the Serb armies and how the Serbian Orthodox Church violently converted Albanian Catholics to Orthodoxism. In Albania, many Catholic churches were robbed, including Orthodox ones. Manhunts were carried out by Serb officers who killed many Albanians, and houses and whole villages were burned down with the inhabitants being burned alive or shot down as they fled. Much of the food was stolen by the Serb soldiers from the Albanian villagers, leading to starvation and disease.

Freundlich writes of the boasting from the Serbian officers, explaining how they robbed houses and massacred the Albanian population wherever they went. Other regions were attacked as well, such as Luma region, where the men were burned alive. Serbian officers openly told Freundlich the justification of burning down 80 villages in Luma region. Other reports stated that Serb volunteers traveled from Serbia and joined in with militaries and proceeded with the atrocities. Freundlich described how 36 Albanians were sentenced to death by a military tribunal and were shot. A Serbian officer invited Freundlich to a "manhunt" and boasted that he had murdered nine Albanians. Other reports spoke of Serb soldiers in Skopje who openly spoke of rape and murder that they had committed, intoxicated by victory. One case which bothered Freundlich was when he was told of a Serb soldier who had broken into an Albanian home and forced the father of the house at gun-point to light up the room as the Serb soldier proceeded to rape the wife and girls.

Notes

References

Serbian–Albanian conflict
1912 in Kosovo
Persecution of Ottoman Muslims
1913 documents
Balkan Wars casualties
Wartime sexual violence
1912 in Albania
1912 in the Ottoman Empire
1912 in Serbia
Anti-Albanian sentiment
Serbian irredentism
1913 in Kosovo
1913 in Albania
1913 in the Ottoman Empire
1913 in Serbia